Jed Drew is an Australian professional footballer who plays as a forward for Macarthur FC. He made his Macarthur debut in an Australian Cup Round of 32 match against Magpies Crusaders on 30 July 2022. Drew made his A-League Men debut against Adelaide United on 16 October 2022 as a 77th minute substitute for Al Hassan Toure. Drew made his first A-League Men start and scored his first professional goal on 13 November 2022 when he scored the winning goal in a 2–3 victory against Central Coast Mariners.

References

External links

Living people
Australian soccer players
Association football forwards
Macarthur FC players
National Premier Leagues players
A-League Men players
2003 births